Grong Grong  is a small town that is located in the Riverina region of New South Wales, Australia.

The name Grong Grong is an Aboriginal term meaning "bad camping ground" or "very bad camping ground".

Bypass
Grong Grong was bypassed in February 2018, to straighten the Newell Highway or A39 by about 2 kilometres and also to eliminate a notorious 25 km/h bend that had caused many accidents, especially trucks overturning.

Demography
Like many rural localities in the area, the population has progressively declined over a number of years, evidenced as follows:

Facilities
The Grong Grong post office was opened on 1 November 1881.

The town has a railway station on the Hay branch off the Main Southern Line. However, the line has closed so with it has the station.

Berembed Weir is located 20 km south of the town. The weir diverts water from the Murrumbidgee River into the main canal which flows onto the Murrimbidgee Irrigation Area to serve irrigation farmers in the Leeton and Griffith area.  The weir and nearby reserve is popular among local anglers, as well as the various riverside locations situated just 5 km to Grong Grong's south.

Sport
The most popular sport in Grong Grong is Australian rules football, as it lies in the narrow 'canola belt', a geographical triangle stretching from Grong Grong and Marrar, New South Wales at either end of the Canola Way, to Ungarie, in which Australian football retains a strong following, despite New South Wales being a largely rugby league supporting state. The local team, Ganmain-Grong Grong-Matong, play in the Riverina Football League.

Regular sporting events include golf, tennis and softball, all hosted at the Grong Grong Sports Club.

Grong Grong also hosts annual sporting events such as the Grong Grong Rodeo, Team Penning and Gymkhana.

Heritage listings
Grong Grong has a number of heritage-listed sites, including:
 Murrumbidgee River: Wooden Wicket, Berembed Weir

Gallery

See also 

 List of reduplicated Australian place names

References

External links 

 Grong Grong railway line
 Grong Grong page at the Narrandera Shire Council

Towns in the Riverina
Towns in New South Wales
Narrandera Shire